Hieronymus Joachims (1619–1660) was an Austrian painter.

Joachims was born in Gemmingen, but he primarily worked and lived in Vienna. One of his works currently resides in the Fürstlich Lichtensteinische Gallery in Vaduz. He died in Vienna on 9 March 1660.

References

External links 

1619 births
1660 deaths
17th-century Austrian painters
Austrian male painters